Vikki Bunce (born 12 February 1983, in Dundee), is a former Scottish international field hockey player who played as a forward for Scotland.

She plays club hockey for Dundee Wanderers. She was a member of the Scotland team which failed to qualify for the World Hockey Cup at the 2006 Women's Hockey World Cup Qualifier in Rome, Italy. Scotland finished in tenth position.

In January 2014, she was the captain of the Scotland team.

Bunce attended Abertay University, graduating with a BSc in Sport, Health & Exercise.

References

External links
 Profile on Scottish Hockey
 Profile on GB Hockey
 
 
 
 

1983 births
Scottish female field hockey players
Living people
Alumni of Abertay University
Sportspeople from Dundee
Field hockey players at the 2006 Commonwealth Games
Commonwealth Games competitors for Scotland